Mihkel Rõuk (5 September 1891 Kabala Parish, Viljandi County – 25 September 1941 Sverdlovsk Oblast) was an Estonian politician. He was a member of Estonian National Assembly.

Following the Soviet occupation of Estonia in 1940, Rõuk was arrested by the NKVD on 14 June 1941 in Türi. He died during interrogation in prison custody in the gulag camp system in Sverdlovsk Oblast,  Russian Soviet Federative Socialist Republic on 25 September 1942.

References

1891 births
1941 deaths
Members of the Estonian National Assembly
People who died in the Gulag
Estonian people who died in Soviet detention
People from Türi Parish